Newell Township may refer to:

 Newell Township, Vermilion County, Illinois
 Newell Township, Buena Vista County, Iowa

Township name disambiguation pages